Ōtaki railway station is a station on the North Island Main Trunk railway line serving Ōtaki in the Kapiti Coast District of New Zealand. It is served by the Capital Connection long distance commuter train between Wellington and Palmerston North.

History 
The station was opened by the Wellington and Manawatu Railway Company (W&MR) as an intermediate station on the Wellington-Manawatu Line in 1886, with an excursion train from Longburn Junction to Ōtaki on 2 August. At that time the journey south to Paikakariki was continued by Hall's coaches. The first through train from Wellington to Palmerston North ran on 30 November 1886. Fergus and Blair of Dunedin had the contract for building the Manakau to Ōtaki section.

The station building was similar to a Fourth Class railway station built for the NZR by the Public Works Department. The station building had a ladies' waiting room and an office for the stationmaster. The yard had four tracks, a loading ramp, a goods shed, and an engine house and turntable. Initially the station was known as New Otaki to differentiate it from the original settlement, but was soon changed to Otaki. A refreshment room was added in 1893.

Following the nationalisation of W&MR in 1908, a new station was opened in 1909, but was destroyed by fire on 24 July 1910. The replacement Type B station was designed by the notable NZR architect George Troup, and opened in February 1911. It has a New Zealand Historic Places Trust Class II listing.

Services 
The following Metlink bus routes serve Ōtaki station:
 290: Ōtaki Beach

Future

Northern Corridor 
With realignment of the Peka Peka to Ōtaki extension of the Kapiti Expressway (part of the Northern Corridor project) north of Ōtaki the rail curve north of Ōtaki was realigned by Easter 2019 and the station yard moved south. The  of realigned route allows for a future double-track formation.

The northern section of the platform was removed, the passing loop was extended north and is now 1050 m long, and the platform extends 60 m south with the new section raised to 680 mm above the railhead (200 mm higher than the previous section). The signalling was upgraded, all train detection is now by axle-counters, and new 50 kg/m rails and composite (plastic) sleepers used beneath the yard turnouts. The deviation was bought into use on 22 April 2019.

Electrification 
There is currently a campaign to extend the electrified commuter services to Ōtaki, following the extension of the electrification of the Kapiti Line from Paraparaumu to Waikanae. In 2012 the Greater Wellington Regional Council investigated extension of the electrification with Matangi trains north of Waikanae to Ōtaki (estimated cost $30 million for the Ōtaki project) and north of Upper Hutt to a new station at Timberlea. However, extension of electrification north to Ōtaki was removed from official long-term rail improvement plans in 2014. The estimated cost of electrification was put between $115m and $135m, which included new trains. New trains were included as trains with toilets would be required, due to the travel time to Wellington to Ōtaki being over one hour. This could be a "final nail in the coffin" for the under threat Capital Connection service from Wellington to Palmerston North, which also stops at Ōtaki. During the 2017 general election, the Green Party proposed extending electrification to Ōtaki as an alternative to the Northern Corridor extension from Peka Peka.

Ōtaki River Bridge 
The bridge was strengthened in 1897 and 1907 and rebuilt in 1931, using a  electric motor for pile driving.

References

Further reading 

 
Hoy, Douglas, West of the Tararuas: An Illustrated History of the Wellington and Manawatu Railway Company  (Wellington, Southern Press, 1972)

External links 
New Zealand Historic Places Trust website - article on Otaki Station
Otaki Railway in the Cyclopaedia of New Zealand (1908)
Photo of 1927 derailment
Capital Connection website
2014 photo of Capital Connection on Ōtaki bridge

Railway stations in New Zealand
Rail transport in Wellington
Buildings and structures in the Kapiti Coast District
Heritage New Zealand Category 2 historic places in the Wellington Region
Railway stations opened in 1886
Ōtaki, New Zealand